Bu Shaqq tower is a mudbrick watch tower in Ras Al Khaimah, United Arab Emirates (UAE).

References 

Watchtowers
History of the United Arab Emirates